Jacob Collins-Levy  (born 18 March 1992) is an Australian actor having played the role of Henry VII, King of England, in The White Princess (2017), and has appeared in True History of the Kelly Gang (2019), Doctor Who (2020), The Witcher: Blood Origin (2022), and was cast in the Disney+ series Nautilus in 2023.

Early life
Collins-Levy was born in Melbourne to an Australian mother and English father. In 2012 and 2013, he took classes at the 16th Street Actors Studio in Melbourne.

Career
After brief appearances in 2015, in Holding the Man and Glitch, Collins-Levy's first major appearance on the big screen came in 2016, as the heartless drug dealer "Saul" in the film Joe Cinque's Consolation, which was selected for the 41st Toronto International Film Festival. Collins-Levy played Henry VII of England in the Starz television series The White Princess, set in the aftermath of the Wars of the Roses, with co-star Jodie Comer as his wife Elizabeth of York.

In 2019, Collins-Levy appeared in Justin Kurzel's film True History of the Kelly Gang. He played Karl-Axel Munck in the first season of the 2020 Netflix crime drama Young Wallander, and guest starred as Lord Byron in the Doctor Who series 12 episode "The Haunting of Villa Diodati". 

In 2022, he appeared in Netflix series The Witcher: Blood Origin where he played the villain, Eredin, in a cast which included Mirren Mack, Lenny Henry, and Michelle Yeoh. The same year, he was cast in the Disney+ series Nautilus as Captain Youngblood.

Collins-Levy performs on stage in his hometown of Melbourne. In 2021, he appeared in a performance of Lanford Wilson's Burn This at fortyfivedownstairs.

Filmography

Film

Television

References

External links
Advoice
Independent Talent

Living people
21st-century Australian male actors
21st-century British male actors
Australian people of Irish descent
Australian male film actors
Australian male television actors
Male actors from Melbourne
1992 births